Jack Williams (born 9 September 1996) is an Australian rugby league footballer who plays as a  and  forward for the Cronulla-Sutherland Sharks in the NRL.

Background
Williams was born in Pambula, New South Wales, Australia.

He played his junior rugby league for the Cooma Colts.

Career

2018
In round 10 of the 2018 NRL season, Williams made his NRL debut for Cronulla, scoring a try in their 24–16 win over the Canberra Raiders.

2019
Williams made a total of 24 appearances for Cronulla in the 2019 NRL season as the club finished 7th on the table and qualified for the finals.  Williams played from the bench in the club's elimination final defeat against Manly at Brookvale Oval.

2020
Williams played 17 games for Cronulla in the 2020 NRL season as the club finished 8th and qualified for the finals.  He played in Cronulla's elimination final loss against Canberra.

2021
Williams played every match for Cronulla in the 2021 NRL season which saw the club narrowly miss the finals by finishing 9th on the table.

2022
Williams was limited to only six appearances for Cronulla in the 2022 NRL season as the club finished second on the table and qualified for the finals.  Williams did not feature in Cronulla's finals campaign which saw them eliminated in the second week by South Sydney.

Statistics

NRL
 Statistics are correct as of the end of the 2022 season

References

External links

Cronulla Sharks profile

1996 births
Australian rugby league players
Australian people of New Zealand descent
Cronulla-Sutherland Sharks players
Newtown Jets NSW Cup players
Rugby league locks
Rugby league second-rows
Living people
Rugby league players from New South Wales